Rowboat Film- und Fernsehproduktion is a German film production company based in Cologne.

History 
Rowboat Film- und Fernsehproduktion GmbH was co-founded in January 2010 by film producer Sam Davis and Jan Mojto's international film distribution company Beta Film.

The company's first movie A Day for a Miracle (Das Wunder von Kärnten) had its première at the Filmfest Hamburg in 2011 and was nominated for the festival's TV producer award. Its TV première on Austria's ORF had more than one million viewers, relating to a market share of 33 percent. German public broadcaster ZDF showed the film on March 5, 2012. Since then Rowboat has produced Murder by the Lake and Professor T.

Filmography 
 A Day for a Miracle, 2011 (Director: Andreas Prochaska)
 , 2012
 The End of Lies, 2013
 , 2013 (Director: Michael Keusch)
 On the Road with Elsa, 2014 (Director: Bettine Woernle)
 The Homecoming, 2014 (Director: Olaf Kreinsen)
 Murder by the Lake - The celtic Mystery, 2014 (Director: Andreas Linke)
 The cold Truth, 2015 (Director: Franziska Meletzky)
 Murder by the Lake 2 - Family Issues, 2015 (Director: Andreas Linke)
 Trust me, 2016 (Director: Franziska Meletzky)
 Because I love you ..., 2016 (Director: Christina Schiewe)
 Murder by the Lake 3 - The Sleepwalker, 2016 (Director: Andreas Linke)
 Murder by the Lake 4 - Till Death do them part, 2017 (Director: Hannu Salonen)
 Professor T. (series) Season 1, 2017 (Director: Thomas Jahn)
 Wedding in Rome, 2017 (Director: Olaf Kreinsen)
 Murder by the Lake 5 - The Girl who loved to laugh, 2017 (Director: Hannu Salonen)
 Murder by the Lake 6 - The Return, 2018 (Director: Hannu Salonen)
 Professor T. (series) Season 2, 2018 (Director: Thomas Jahn)
 Murder by the Lake 7 - The fourth Woman, 2018 (Director: Hannu Salonen)
 Murder by the Lake 8 - Death in the Forest (Director: Michael Schneider)
 Murder by the Lake 9 - Mermaid (Director: Michael Schneider)
 Professor T. (series) Season 3, Postproduction (Director: Thomas Jahn)
 Skin and Bones, 2019 (Director: Christina Schiewe)
 Murder by the Lake 10 - Curse from the Depth, 2020 (Director: Michael Schneider)
 Murder by the Lake 11 - Blood Procession, 2020 (Director: Michael Schneider)
 Murder by the Lake 12 - Haunted, 2020 (Director: Michael Schneider)
 Murder by the Lake 13 - Soul Circel, 2021 (Director: Michael Schneider)
 Take me Home, 2021 (Director: Christiane Balthasar)
 Murder Squared, 2021 (Director: Michael Schneider)
 Faster than Fear (series), 2022 (Director: Florian Baxmeyer)
 Murder by the Lake 14 - The Second Face, 2022 (Director: Christian Theede)
 Jeanny - The Fifth Girl, 2022 (Director: Andreas Kopriva)

Awards 
A Day for a Miracle was awarded two Austrian TV awards Romy in 2012, for "Best TV screenplay" (by Thorsten Wettcke and Christoph Silber) and "Best TV Producer" (Sam Davis, Rowboat and co-producer Klaus Graf of Graf Film, Austria), director Andreas Prochaska won the Bavarian TV Award for "Best Directing TV Movie" in 2012. On November 25, 2013, the film was awarded an International Emmy Award 2013 in the category  "TV Movie/Mini-Series".

References

External links 
 Website of Rowboat Film- und Fernsehproduktion GmbH

Film production companies of Germany
Companies based in Cologne
Entertainment companies established in 2010